Industrial Training  Institute  Gariahat known  as ITI Gariahat , is one of the oldest government vocational training institutes, located in Gariahat Road, Kolkata, West Bengal. It offers different training courses in becoming a civil draughtsman, mechanical draughtsman, surveyor, instrument mechanic, electronic mechanic, diesel mechanic, motor vehicle mechanic, cutting and sewing, plumber, electrician, fitter, machinist, turner, welder, and wireman.

References
ITI Gariahat  
 Industrial Training Institute (ITI)  in West Bengal
Educational institutions in India